Luis de Llano Macedo (born June 9, 1945) is a Mexican TV and musical producer.

History
Born in Mexico City in 1945, he is the son of television producer Luis de Llano Palmer and actress Rita Macedo. His older sister is the actress and singer Julissa. He started as a technician in a TV station in San Antonio, Texas at the early age of 17. In 1969 he became director of promotions for channels 2, 4 and 5 for Televisa. By 1971 he became Creative Director, and by 1973 he was producer and director for this same company.

Since 1992 he's been the VP of musical programming for Televisa and has been in charge of production for a variety of TV shows such as: Premios TVyNovelas, Nuestra Belleza México and Acafest. 
Throughout this same time he has produced numerous soap operas and other weekly TV shows such as Cachun Cachun Ra Ra and Timbiriche, Papá soltero, sábados del Rock, Música futura, las entregas de los premios "Heraldos", Miss Universo Cancún, México and Mundial de futbol México 86.
Cultural programs: VideoCosmos.

Soap operas
2017: Alcanzar una estrella with Paula Marcellini and Eleazar Gómez
2011: Esperanza del Corazón with Lucía Méndez, Bianca Marroquin and Patricio Borghetti
2010: Atrévete a soñar with René Strickler and Danna Paola
2000: DKDA with Alessandra Rosaldo and Ernesto D'Alessio
1997: Mi generación with Laisha Wilkins and Aylín Mújica
1996: Canción de amor with Lorena Rojas and Eduardo Capetillo
1996: Confidente de Secundaria with Iran Catillo and Flavio Cesar
1994: Agujetas de color de rosa with Natalia Esperón and Flavio Cesar
1992: Baila conmigo with Bibi Gaytán and Eduardo Capetillo
1991: Alcanzar una estrella II with Ricky Martin and Sasha Sokol
1990: Alcanzar una estrella with Eduardo Capetillo and Mariana Garza
1980: Colorina with Lucía Méndez and his sister Julissa

Television shows
1982 to 1983 Chulas fronteras with Edna Bolcan y Cepillin
1986 to 1994: Papá soltero with César Costa and Edith Marquez
1981 to 1987: Cachún cachún ra ra! with Daniela Castro, Ernesto Laguardia and Lupita Sandoval

Movies
1988  Cachún Cachún RaRa with Fernando Arau, Alfredo Alegria, Alma Delfina, Lili Garza, Lupita Sandoval, Rodolfo Rodriguez, Tito de Mara, Roberto Huicochea, Pepe Magaña, Arian Metcalf, Alejandro Chiangueroti, El Jager, etc...
1992: Más que alcanzar una estrella (film)
1992: Donde Quedo la Bolita with Garibaldi

Annual TV shows
1982 to 1987  Premios el Heraldo de México
2000 to present: Premios TVyNovelas
2004 to present: Nuestra Belleza México
2005 to present: Acafest

Musical groups
1988: Micro Chips1991: Muñecos de papel with Ricky Martin, Sasha Sokol, Erik Rubin, Bibi Gaytán, Angélica Rivera, and Pedro Fernández.
1988: Garibaldi with Patricia Manterola, Pilar Montenegro, Luisa Fernanda, Katia Llanos, Victor Noriega, Sergio Mayer, Xavier Ortiz, and Charly López
1982: Timbiriche'' with Sasha Sokol, Erik Rubin, Paulina Rubio, Benny Ibarra, Mariana Garza, Diego Schoening, and Alix Bauer

References

1945 births
Living people
Mexican telenovela producers